Willard is a city in southwestern Huron County, Ohio, United States, approximately  southwest of Norwalk. The population was 6,236 at the 2010 census.

History
The original name of Willard was Chicago, named for the junction of the Baltimore and Ohio Railroad's line to Sandusky (the Sandusky, Mansfield and Newark Railroad) and the branch west to Chicago (the Baltimore and Ohio and Chicago Railroad). Later the Akron and Chicago Junction Railroad was built east from the junction, providing a more direct route between the Northeastern United States and Chicago.

With the name "Chicago", passengers would mistake the community for Chicago, Illinois, so they changed the name to Chicago Junction, however, the word "junction" did not fit on boards at the time so it did not fix the problem. In 1917, to finally rectify the confusion, the town changed its name to Willard, after the then president of the B&O, Daniel Willard. Willard officially became a city in the year of 1960

Geography
Willard is located at  (41.054649, -82.727982).

To the south of Willard are located the unincorporated communities of Celeryville and New Haven, plus the planned development of Holiday Lakes to the north.

Demographics

2010 census
As of the census of 2010, there were 6,236 people, 2,365 households, and 1,585 families living in the city. The racial makeup of the city was 90.0% White, 1.8% African American, 0.2% Native American, 0.2% Asian, 5.6% from other races, and 2.1% from two or more races. Hispanic or Latino of any race were 18.9% of the population.

There were 2,365 households, of which 37.1% had children under the age of 18 living with them, 44.1% were married couples living together, 17.5% had a female householder with no husband present, 5.4% had a male householder with no wife present, and 33.0% were non-families. 28.2% of all households were made up of individuals, and 11.2% had someone living alone who was 65 years of age or older. The average household size was 2.60 and the average family size was 3.15.

The median age in the city was 34.6 years. 28.7% of residents were under the age of 18; 9.2% were between the ages of 18 and 24; 24.8% were from 25 to 44; 23.7% were from 45 to 64; and 13.8% were 65 years of age or older. The gender makeup of the city was 48% male, 52% female.

2000 census
As of the census of 2000, there were 6,806 people, 2,545 households, and 1,738 families living in the city. The population density was 1,963.0 people per square mile (757.3/km). There were 2,715 housing units at an average density of 783.1 per square mile (302.1/km). The racial makeup of the city was 90.32% White, 1.54% African American, 0.19% Native American, 0.31% Asian, 0.01% Pacific Islander, 6.11% from other races, and 1.51% from two or more races. Hispanic or Latino of any race were 12.47% of the population.

There were 2,545 households, out of which 38.0% had children under the age of 18 living with them, 50.1% were married couples living together, 14.0% had a female householder with no husband present, and 31.7% were non-families. 27.7% of all households were made up of individuals, and 11.6% had someone living alone who was 65 years of age or older. The average household size was 2.63 and the average family size was 3.22.

In the city the population was spread out, with 30.8% under the age of 18, 9.8% from 18 to 24, 27.8% from 25 to 44, 19.4% from 45 to 64, and 12.2% who were 65 years of age or older. The median age was 32 years. For every 100 females, there were 90.1 males. For every 100 females age 18 and over, there were 86.7 males.

The median income for a household in the city was $28,911, and the median income for a family was $35,271. Males had a median income of $30,377 versus $22,702 for females. The per capita income for the city was $13,942. About 12.7% of families and 16.2% of the population were below the poverty line, including 20.9% of those under age 18 and 9.5% of those age 65 or over.

Economy

Several key businesses have a presence in Willard, including the Willard Rail Yard of CSX Transportation, Midwest Industries, LSC Communications (formerly known as RR Donnelley), Pepperidge Farm, and Mercy Hospital of Willard.  Farmland surrounds the community, with the primary crops being soybeans, wheat, onions, radishes, lettuce, and sweet corn.

Education
Willard City Schools operates Willard High School in the city.

Willard is served by the Willard Memorial Library.

Willard High School students are able to choose between the local school and Pioneer Career and Technology Center (located in Shelby, Ohio) in order to learn a trade skill.

Notable people
 Charlie Frye, NFL quarterback
 Harry Jump, Ohio State Senator
 Pam Postema, first woman to umpire a Major League Baseball spring training game
 Sean Swarner, first cancer survivor to complete the Seven Summits, author of Keep Climbing

See also

 List of cities in Ohio

References

Further reading
 Source: <Dush, F. Joseph, History of Willard, Ohio with Pioneer Sketches of New Haven, Greenfield, Norwich and Richmond Townships>
 Source: <Baughman, A.J. "History of Huron County, vol I and II>
 History of Willard. Willard City Official Website. http://www.willardohio.us/

External links

 

Cities in Ohio
Cities in Huron County, Ohio
Populated places established in 1917
1917 establishments in Ohio